The 2013–14 Serbian Cup season is the eighth season of the Serbian national football tournament.

The competition will start on 4 September 2013 and concludes with the Final on 7 May 2014.

The winner of the competition will qualify for the 2014–15 UEFA Europa League.

Calendar

Preliminary round
A preliminary round was held in order to reduce the number of teams competing in the next round to 32. It consisted of 7 single-legged ties, with penalty shoot-out as decider, if the score was tied after 90 minutes. Appearing in this round were bottom 9 teams from 2012–13 Serbian First League, as well as 5 regional cup winners. The draw contained seeded and unseeded teams. Bottom 9 teams from 2012–13 Serbian First League (Sloga Kraljevo, Timok, Inđija, Teleoptik, Radnički Nova Pazova, Banat Zrenjanin, OFK Mladenovac, Kolubara and RFK Novi Sad) were set as seeded teams, with 5 regional cup winners (IM Rakovica, Partizan Bumbarevo Brdo, Trstenik PPT, Radnički Sremska Mitrovica and Mokra Gora) being set as unseeded teams. After drawing 5 seeded-unseeded match-ups, remaining 2 fixtures were determined by regular draw, without seeds. The matches were played on 4 September 2013. Average attendance for preliminary round matches was 490.

Round of 32
In this round, seven winners from the previous round were joined by all 16 teams from Serbian Superliga from 2012–13, as well as top 9 teams from Serbian First League from 2012–13. The draw contained seeded and unseeded teams. Hajduk Kula, which finished 8th in Serbian Superliga previous season was dissolved after propositions for this season's cup competition were established. Thus only 15 teams from 2012–13 Serbian SuperLiga (Partizan, Crvena Zvezda, Vojvodina, Jagodina, Sloboda Užice, OFK Beograd, Rad, Spartak Subotica, Javor Ivanica, Donji Srem, Radnički Niš, Radnički 1923, Novi Pazar, BSK Borča (II), Smederevo (II)) were set as seeded teams. After 15 drawn ties, remaining undrawn unseeded team was Voždovac, and it received an automatic bye to the next round. Draw was held on 12 September 2013. The matches were played on 25 September 2013. No extra time was played if the score was tied after regular 90 minutes, with games going straight into penalties. Average attendance for first round matches was 1400.

Round of 16
16 winners from first round took part in this stage of the competition. The draw was scheduled for 8 October 2013, and it contained seeded and unseeded teams. Seedings were determined by last season's final standings in top two Serbian divisions. Seeded teams: Partizan, Crvena Zvezda, Vojvodina, Jagodina, Sloboda Užice, OFK Beograd, Spartak Subotica and Donji Srem. Unseeded teams: Radnički Niš, Radnički 1923, Novi Pazar, Napredak Kruševac, Čukarički, Voždovac, Jedinstvo Užice (II) and Borac Čačak (II). The matches were played on 30 October 2013. No extra time was played in case of tie after 90 minutes. Those games went straight into penalty shoot-out. Average attendance for second round matches was 2720.

Quarter-finals
8 winners from second round take part in this stage of the competition. The draw was held on 11 November 2013, and contained seeded and unseeded teams. Seedings were determined by following key: Last season's cup semifinalists were automatically set as seeded teams, with remaining seeds determined by last season final standings in top two Serbian divisions. Seeded teams: Jagodina, Vojvodina, OFK Beograd, Partizan. Unseeded teams: Crvena Zvezda, Sloboda Užice, Spartak Subotica, Donji Srem. The matches were played on 4 December 2013.

Semi-finals
4 winners from Quarter finals (Jagodina, Vojvodina, OFK Beograd and Spartak Subotica) take part in this stage of the competition. The draw was held on 17 December 2013. There were no seedings in the draw. Semi-finals were contested over two legs. Aggregate winners qualified for the Cup finals. First legs were played on 26 March 2014, and second legs were played on 9 April 2014.

|}

First legs

Second legs

Final
2 winners from Semi-finals took part in the single-legged final. The final game was played on 7 May 2014.

References

External links
 Official site

Serbian Cup seasons
Cup
Serbian Cup